George Thomas Fleming (born 1910, Sedgefield, died 1977) was an England international lawn bowler.

Bowls career
He won a gold medal in the Men's Rinks (Fours) at the 1962 British Empire and Commonwealth Games in Perth, with Sidney Drysdale, David Bryant and Les Watson.

He won twice the runner-up in the 1959 and 1960 singles National Championship representing Albert Park Middlesbrough and Yorkshire.

References

1910 births
1977 deaths
Commonwealth Games gold medallists for England
Commonwealth Games medallists in lawn bowls
Bowls players at the 1962 British Empire and Commonwealth Games
English male bowls players
Medallists at the 1962 British Empire and Commonwealth Games